Csiszár or Csiszar (from an old, now defunct Hungarian word for swordsmith; cf. the Hungarian verb csiszál/csiszol "to sand, rub, polish") is a Hungarian surname. It may refer to:
 Brede Frettem Csiszar (born 1987), Norwegian professional ice hockey defenceman
 Henrietta Csiszár (born 1994), Hungarian football midfielder
 Imre Csiszár (born 1938), Hungarian mathematician

References 

Hungarian-language surnames
Occupational surnames